John C. Carbine  (October 12, 1855 – September 11, 1915) was an American professional baseball player who played first base for the 1875 Keokuk Westerns and 1876 Louisville Grays.

External links

Keokuk Westerns players
Louisville Grays players
19th-century baseball players
1855 births
1915 deaths
Major League Baseball first basemen
Baseball players from Syracuse, New York